Tim Martin (born April 12, 1967 in San Jose, California) is a former American soccer defender.  Over his twelve-year professional career, he played with numerous teams in six leagues, winning the 1994 U.S. Open Cup with the San Francisco Greek-Americans and the 1991 American Professional Soccer League title with the San Francisco Bay Blackhawks.  He also earned two caps with the U.S. national team.  Since retiring from playing in 2000, he has become a college and youth soccer coach.

Player

Youth
Martin began his college career at UC Berkeley in 1986.  However, he transferred to Fresno State where he would go on to play three season (1987–1989) for the Bulldogs.  During those three seasons, Martin captained the team and earned honors as the 1989 Big West player of the year, made Big West and Far West Regional First Teams.   In 1989, he was also selected as an NCAA First Team All-American.  He finished his career at Fresno State with 25 assists.

Club
In 1987, Martin spent the collegiate off season with the San Jose Earthquakes.  He was First Team All League that season.  In 1989, Martin signed with the San Francisco Bay Blackhawks of the Western Soccer Alliance (WSA) as a midfielder.   In 1990, the WSA merged with the American Soccer League to form the American Professional Soccer League (APSL).  Martin continued to play with the Blackhawks through the 1992 season when he saw time in only one game for as the team ran to an 8–8 record.   At the end of the season, the team's owner moved the Blackhawks to the lower division USISL and renamed the team the San Jose Hawks.  Martin spent the 1993 USISL season with the Hawks, but the team folded at the end of the season.  He then moved to the semi-pro San Francisco Greek-Americans.   Martin and the Greek-Americans won the 1994 U.S. Open Cup.  In the fall of 1994, Martin played with the Fort Lauderdale Strikers of the APSL.
In 1995, Martin joined the Atlanta Ruckus of the A-League where he was voted to the USISL All-Star team.

In February 1996, the San Jose Clash selected Martin in the third round (twenty-eight overall) in the league's Inaugural Player Draft. He spent three seasons with the Clash before being released at the end of the 1998 season.  In 1996, the Clash named Martin the team's Defender of the Year.  In February 1999, the Colorado Rapids selected Martin in the third round (thirty-second overall) of the 1999 MLS Supplemental Draft.  He spent the 1999 season in Colorado as the Rapids went to the MLS quarterfinals as well as the U.S. Open Cup championship game.  Martin retired from the Rapids on February 22, 2000.

Following his retirement from MLS, Martin signed with the A-League Bay Area Seals for the 2000 season.  He was named the USL Defender of the Year for 2000, then retired permanently.

National team
Martin earned two caps with the U.S. National Team.  His first game with the national team came on November 14, 1993 in an 8–1 win over the Cayman Islands.  Martin was a halftime substitute for Jeff Agoos.  His second cap came three years later in the infamous October 16, 1996 defeat to Peru.  For that game, the United States Soccer Federation was forced to field a team of fringe players after the national team went on strike just prior to the game.

Coach
Since retiring from playing professionally, Martin lives in the Bay Area where he co-founded USA Seventeen Academy, a youth soccer academy.   In 2001, Cañada College hired Martin as the school's soccer coach. Martin was later hired by Santa Clara Sporting as coaching director and released for actions not disclosed by Sporting. In 2004, he moved to Santa Clara University where he is an assistant coach to the men's soccer team.

References

External links
 1996 MLS player bios
 Colorado Rapids data sheet with photo
 Santa Clara coaching profile

1967 births
Living people
All-American men's college soccer players
American Professional Soccer League players
American soccer coaches
American soccer players
Atlanta Silverbacks players
Bay Area Seals players
California Golden Bears men's soccer players
Colorado Rapids players
Fresno State Bulldogs men's soccer players
Fort Lauderdale Strikers (1988–1994) players
Major League Soccer players
Milwaukee Wave players
National Professional Soccer League (1984–2001) players
San Francisco Bay Blackhawks players
San Francisco Greek-American A.C. players
San Jose Earthquakes players
San Jose Earthquakes (1974–1988) players
San Jose Hawks players
Santa Clara Broncos men's soccer coaches
United States men's international soccer players
Western Soccer Alliance players
A-League (1995–2004) players
MLS Pro-40 players
Soccer players from San Jose, California
Colorado Rapids draft picks
Association football defenders
Cañada Colts men's soccer coaches